The 2019–20 season is Santamarina's 7th consecutive season in the second division of Argentine football, Primera B Nacional.

The season generally covers the period from 1 July 2019 to 30 June 2020.

Review

Pre-season
Leonel Pierce's departure was revealed on 11 June 2019, as the defensive midfielder moved to Romania with Botoșani. 18 June saw Deportivo Morón sign Francisco Oliver, six days prior to Patricio Boolsen arriving from Racing Club to become Santamarina's first reinforcement. Román Strada followed him in on 30 June from Mitre. Three transactions were announced on 1 July, with Lucas Kruspzky (Aldosivi) and Fernando Piñero (Central Córdoba) signing while Leonardo Morales headed to Gimnasia y Esgrima (LP). Agustín Guiffrey was loaned from Patronato on 4 July, a day before Lautaro Arregui penned terms from Racing Club. Gustavo Iturra (Racing Club) and Joaquín Papaleo (Unión Santa Fe) loans were communicated on 7 July, as the latter joined for a third stint.

In the week leading up to their first exhibition, Adrián Scifo and Marcelo Guzmán joined the club while Agustín Politano left. Santamarina's first pre-season opponents were Círculo Deportivo, who they fought and beat by two goals in Comandante Nicanor Otamendi on 17 July. On 24 July, Santamarina met Almirante Brown in friendlies. Luca Orozco came from Olimpo on 25 July. Federico Paulucci was signed by Ferro Carril Oeste (GP) on 26 July. Alvarado visited Santamarina twice on 27 July, as they left the Estadio Municipal General San Martín undefeated. Guido Rancez, on 7 August, became a new player of Torneo Federal A's Chaco For Ever. Santamarina had a second match with Círculo Deportivo on 9 August, as a scoreless draw concluded their pre-season.

A fourth loan incoming, Jonás Acevedo from San Lorenzo, was confirmed on 14 August.

August
Santamarina opened their Primera B Nacional season with no goals as they drew away to Sarmiento on 17 August. They suffered defeat on matchday two, as Deportivo Riestra took all the points after a goal from Esteban Pipino. Santamarina secured their first competitive victory of the campaign on 31 August, defeating Chacarita Juniors 0–3.

Squad

Transfers
Domestic transfer windows:3 July 2019 to 24 September 201920 January 2020 to 19 February 2020.

Transfers in

Transfers out

Loans in

Friendlies

Pre-season
Santamarina opened their pre-season campaign against Círculo Deportivo on 17 July, before facing Almirante Brown on 24 July and Alvarado on 27 July. Another encounter with Círculo Deportivo closed their preparation period on 9 August.

Competitions

Primera B Nacional

Results summary

Matches
The fixtures for the 2019–20 league season were announced on 1 August 2019, with a new format of split zones being introduced. Santamarina were drawn in Zone B.

Squad statistics

Appearances and goals

Statistics accurate as of 3 September 2019.

Goalscorers

Notes

References

Club y Biblioteca Ramón Santamarina seasons
Santamarina